The Latvia national under-19 football team is the national under-19 football team of Latvia and is controlled by the Latvian Football Federation.

The team competes in the UEFA European Under-19 Football Championship, held every year.

Coaching staff

Current players
The following squad has been called up for the 2020 UEFA European Under-19 Championship qualification round matches, taking place in Rīga, Latvia on 8–14 October 2019.

See also
Latvia football team
Latvia U-21
Latvia U-17

References 

Under-19
European national under-19 association football teams